There have been several Israeli disengagement plans:
 Israeli disengagement from Gaza, a 2005 unilateral disengagement and pull-out on the part of Israel from the Gaza Strip
 Sinai Disengagement Agreements, disengagement plans between Egypt and Israel over the Sinai Peninsula from the mid-1970s
 Agreement on Disengagement between Israel and Syria, disengagement plan between Syria and Israel over the Golan Heights
 Jordan's disengagement from the West Bank, Jordan's disengagement from Israel and the West Bank in 1988 over the West Bank